Ford Butte is a  elevation summit located on Navajo Nation land in San Juan County of northwest New Mexico, United States. It is a landmark set one mile east of U.S. Route 491, along with its nearest higher neighbor, Bennett Peak, on the opposite side of the highway. Ford Butte is set in the northeastern part of the Navajo Volcanic Field, a volcanic field that includes intrusions and flows of minette and other unusual igneous rocks which formed around 30 million years ago during the Oligocene. This geographical feature's name was officially adopted in 1915 by the U.S. Board on Geographic Names.

Climbing
The first ascent of the north summit was made in 1971 by Mark Dalen and David Nordstrom via a  route. The south summit was first climbed April 6, 1990, by Cameron Burns and Mike Baker via a class 5.9 route.  Climbing here requires permission from Navajo authorities.

Climate 
According to the Köppen climate classification system, Ford Butte is located in a semi-arid climate zone with cold winters and hot summers. Ford Butte is within the Chaco River drainage basin.

See also
 Rock formations in the United States
 Volcanic plug

References

External links
 Weather forecast: National Weather Service
 Ford Butte rock climbing: Mountainproject.com

Rock formations of New Mexico
Landmarks in New Mexico
Volcanic plugs of the United States
Diatremes of New Mexico
Landforms of San Juan County, New Mexico
Geography of the Navajo Nation
Oligocene volcanism